Kim Tae-kyun (born June 17, 1960) is a South Korean film director. Kim wrote and directed Volcano High (2001) and Temptation of Wolves (2004). He also directed The Adventures of Mrs. Park (1996), First Kiss (1998), A Millionaire's First Love, Crossing (2008), Higanjima (2010), A Barefoot Dream (2010), Innocent Thing (2014), and Bad Sister (2014). Crossing and A Barefoot Dream were selected as the South Korean entries for Best Foreign Language Film at the 81st and 83rd Academy Awards, but both did not make the final shortlist.

Filmography
관계 (short film, 1987) - lighting
Moon (short film, 1987) - credits 
Stopping for a While (short film, 1987) - director
My Love, My Bride (1990) - line producer
As You Please (1992) - executive producer
First Kiss (1993) - line producer
Bitter and Sweet  (1995) - executive producer
The Adventures of Mrs. Park (1996) - director
First Kiss  (1998) - director
Julseogi (short film, 1999) - director
Volcano High (2001) - director, screenwriter
At 2 O'clock (short film, 2003; included in the omnibus Twentidentity) - director
Temptation of Wolves (2004) - director, screenwriter
I'm OK (short film, 2005; included in the omnibus 3 Colors Love Story) - director
A Millionaire's First Love (2006) - director
Crossing (2008) - director
Higanjima (2010) - director
A Barefoot Dream (2010) - director, producer, script editor
The Dearest (2012) - production adviser
Sympathy for Us (2012) - production adviser
Choked (2012) - production adviser
Mirage (2012) - production adviser
When Winter Screams (2013) - production and screenplay consultant
Your Time Is Up (2013) - production consultant
INGtoogi: The Battle of Internet Trolls (2013) - production consultant
Innocent Thing (2014) - director, executive producer
A Pharisee (2014) - producer 
Bad Sister (2014) - director
Beastie Girls (2017) - producer

Awards
2008 Foreign Press Promotion Award, Film category (Crossing)
2008 18th Korean Catholic Mass Communication Award (Crossing)
2008 16th Chunsa Film Art Awards: Best Director (Crossing)
2010 19th Golden Rooster and Hundred Flowers Awards: Best Director of a Foreign Film (A Barefoot Dream)

References

External links

1960 births
Living people
South Korean film directors
South Korean screenwriters
South Korean film producers
People from Seoul